The Masquerade Dress is an early 20th century painting by American artist Robert Henri. Done in oil on canvas, the portrait depicts Henri's wife Marjorie, who herself produced art under her maiden name, Marjorie Organ. The work is in the collection of the Metropolitan Museum of Art, in New York.

References

1911 paintings
American paintings
Paintings in the collection of the Metropolitan Museum of Art